Kohl is a German surname derived from the word kohl, meaning cabbage. It tends to originate as an occupational name for a merchant or cultivator of the crops.

Cabbage was most likely domesticated somewhere in Europe in Ancient history before 1000 BC. Cabbage in the cuisine has been documented since Antiquity. It was described as a table luxury in the Roman Empire. By the Middle Ages, cabbage had become a prominent part of European cuisine, as indicated by manuscript illuminations. New variates were introduced from the Renaissance on, mostly by Germanic-speaking peoples.

Notable people with the surname
 Bernhard Kohl (born 1982), Austrian professional cyclist
 Christiane Kohl, German soprano
 Franz Friedrich Kohl (1851–1924), Austrian entomologist
 Hannelore Kohl (1933–2001), wife of Helmut Kohl
 Helmut Kohl (1930–2017), Chancellor of Germany 1982–1998
 Herb Kohl (born 1935), United States senator
 Herbert Ralph Kohl (born 1937), United States writer
 Jeanne Kohl-Welles (born 1942), American politician
 Jerome Kohl (1946–2020), American musicologist
 Joseph Kohl (1831–1917), third mayor of Neutral Moresnet
 Ludwig Kohl-Larsen (1884–1969), German physician, amateur anthropologist, and explorer
 Peter Kohl (scientist), German physiologist
 Sheryl Davis Kohl (born 1962), former Maryland politician
 Sisca Kohl (born 2002), Indonesian internet celebrity

See also
 Kohl (disambiguation)
 Kohler
 Kohl's, a company that operates department stores located in the United States
 Kohl Children's Museum in Glenview, Illinois, United States

References

German-language surnames
Occupational surnames